Matt Lucas (born 1974) is a British comedian, screenwriter, actor and singer.

Matt Lucas may also refer to:

 Matt Lucas (singer) (born 1935), American singer 
 Matt Lucas (rugby union) (born 1992), Australian footballer

See also
 Mat Lucas (born 1979), American voice actor